Hannah Gonzalez (born 21 November 1990, Cali, Colombia) is a Colombian disc jockey of electronic music, musical producer and model.

Career
Hannah Gonzalez began her career as a DJ at the age of 15, during which time she adopted the name Liz Gonzalez. During the earlier stages of her career, she focused on musical genres such as vocal house and progressive house. Eventually, she was invited to mix electronic music festivals in many cities throughout Colombia.

Once she began to establish herself in the electronic scene of her country, she adapted the pseudonym Deejane Hannah.

In the year 2009, she made a series of exclusive sets for the Electroemite radio program of Medellín, a program that frequently features new Colombian talent.

In 2013, she released the albums Orgasmic Sessions (which included two volumes), and Elitech (which also had two volumes). This work eventually led her to be invited to appear in Ecuador, Panama, Argentina and Punta Cana in the Dominican Republic, where she shared the stage with British band Franz Ferdinand. After that tour, she was invited to appear with DJ Umek in a show in Medellin.

Further recognition as a DJ was generated on the El Cartel de La Mega program on the Colombian station RCN Radio in June 2011. She finished the year with her eighth production, called Happy Birthday to Me and was invited to represent Colombia in Guatemala together with the official DJ of the Playboy mansion in the U.S., DJ Rihanon.

She launched her musical work Dance or Die at the beginning of 2012, returning to the house style as when she began her career. In addition, she launched her website.

In the middle of that year, she played in a rave party organized by Beer Barena in Tegucigalpa, Honduras.
Hannah Gonzalez was born in Colombia on November 21st, 1990. Her musical career spans 15 years. She began DJing as a teenager, making her at the time one of the youngest female DJs in the world. Hannah has developed a unique style of house, a mathematical technique of mixing tracks, loops, and live acapellas. With precision and harmony, she is able to deliver sets that showcase her limitless musical expertise as she finds herself performing in a multitude of settings.

Self-taught, Hannah is in a constant state of musical innovation, seeking new elements and inspiring sounds to delight her fans. A jet-setter in the truest sense of the term, Hannah has toured throughout Latin America, the Caribbean, Europe, Asia, and North America. She has performed a run of shows at Electronic Music's Paradise in Ibiza, Spain and made shows in the Dubai city in the United Arab Emirates. Since settling first in NYC and now residing in Miami, she has played iconic North American venues such as Pacha NYC, Space Miami, Space Ibiza NY, Cielo, Output, Treehouse, Heart Miami, Trade, and many more unique spaces. Hannah's extensive performance career has combined the best of her musical repertoire with the elegance of her staging.

Since beginning her career, Hannah has experimented with a variety of styles within the house genre, including tribe house, tech house, and currently afro house, always with the premise of making the public live an experience of total connection with music. With her pedigree higher than ever before, few producers have enjoyed such a frenetic rise to the top, and Hannah shows no signs of slowing down. Currently, Hannah is spending an extensive amount of time on her first album, which she hopes to release in 2022 and will include some remastered tracks she made throughout her career.
translate to spanish

Awards
In 2011 Gonzalez won a popularity contest on Twitter, organized by PremiosTwCo and sponsored by Samsung Mobile Colombia, in categories Twittera Sexy and Twittero Dj.

Discography

Singles 

 "Hipnotik" (2011)
 "My Roots" (2011)
 "Elixir" (2011)
 "Happy Birthday to Me" (2011)

Mixed Albums 
 "Orgasmic Vol. 1" (2010)
 "Orgasmic Vol. 2" (2010)
 "Elitech Vol. 1" (2010)
 "Elitech Vol. 2 (2010)
 "Dance or Die Vol.1" (2012)
 "Dance or Die Vol.2" (2012)
 "Partylicious (Radio Show)" (2013)

References

External links
 

1990 births
Living people
Electro house musicians
Colombian female models